Adahisa Peña Arteaga (born August 6, 1984) is a pageant titleholder, born in Valencia, Venezuela. She was represented of the Apure state in the Miss Venezuela 2008 pageant, on September 10, 2008, and won the Miss Congeniality award and proceeded to represent Venezuela in multiple International contests.
Peña once considered one of Venezuelan's top fashion models, participating in International Runways for renowned designers such as Tommy Hilfiger, Angel Sanchez, and Carolina Herrera among others; is currently based in the US where she continues her career participating in multiple projects as a sports and entertainment TV host.

References

External links
Miss Venezuela Official Website
Miss Venezuela La Nueva Era MB
[https://www.telemundodenver.com/videos/acceso-total_-verano-en-denver_tlmd-denver/1464/

1984 births
Living people
Venezuelan female models
People from Valencia, Venezuela